Giovanni Marcora (22 December 1922 – 5 February 1983) was an Italian businessman, politician and minister.

Biography

He was born at Inveruno, near Milan. After the Armistice with Italy of 8 September 1943, aged 21, Marcora entered the Italian resistance movement, with the nickname of Albertino, fighting in  the province of Milan and the Ossola, and participating in  the liberation of Milan on 25 April 1945.

He was one of the founders of the Christian Democracy (Democrazia Cristiana). He later was appointed as party's  provincial secretary of Milan and vice-secretary national. In 1968 he became senator for the college of Vimercate. Between 1970 and 1975 and from 1980 until his death he was also mayor of Inveruno.

In 1974 Aldo Moro called him as  minister of Agriculture in his cabinet, an office that Marcora held uninterruptedly until 1980, before moving to the Ministry of Industry in 1981–82.

He died at Inveruno of cancer in 1983.

1922 births
1983 deaths
People from the Province of Milan
Christian Democracy (Italy) politicians
Italian resistance movement members
20th-century Italian politicians